Mohammad Hossein Fallah (born 7 March 2000) is an Iranian footballer who plays as a forward for Iranian club Paykan in the Persian Gulf Pro League.

Club career

Esteghlal Tehran
He made his debut in Iran Pro League for Esteghlal in 12th fixtures of 2020–21 Iran Pro League against Saipa while he substituted in for Dariush Shojaeian.

References 

Living people
Sportspeople from Mazandaran province
Iranian footballers
Esteghlal F.C. players
Paykan F.C. players
Persian Gulf Pro League players
Association football forwards
2000 births